Hello & Good Morning is the second extended play (EP) by British indie rock band The Crocketts. Recorded at The Garden in London with producer Charlie Francis, the EP features four tracks and was released in September 1997 by Blue Dog Records in conjunction with V2 Records. "Will You Still Care" was later featured on the band's first full-length album, We May Be Skinny & Wirey, released in 1998.

Promotion
In promotion of Hello & Good Morning, the band completed a short tour in September 1997, performing five shows in Doncaster, Exeter, Cheltenham, London and Maidstone.

Track listing
All songs credited to Davey MacManus/The Crocketts.

Personnel

The Crocketts
Davey MacManus ("Davey Crockett") – vocals, guitar
Dan Harris ("Dan Boone") – guitar
Richard Carter ("Rich Wurzel") – bass
Owen Hopkin ("Owen Cash") – drums

Additional personnel
Charlie Francis – production
Scott Howland – recording assistance
Gareth Parton – mixing assistance
John Mossige – photography

References

1997 EPs
The Crocketts albums
V2 Records EPs